Kalu (also Romanized as Kalū and Kolū) is a village in Howmeh Rural District, in the Central District of Minab County, Hormozgan Province, Iran. At the 2006 census, its population was 112, in 28 families.

References 

Populated places in Minab County